Aquí hay tomate was a popular Spanish television program produced by Salta and issued by the chain Telecinco. It premiered on March 24, 2003, broadcasting Monday to Friday afternoon, the final broadcast was February 1, 2008.

Format
Aquí hay tomate focused on tabloid stories and the world of celebrities. The basis of the program was the stories (mostly on tape) and to a lesser extent, the interviews. The approach ranged from satire and mockery to sensationalism, which resulted in numerous complaints to them. Therefore, it is regarded as telebasura.

Audiences
2002/03 (started broadcasting in March 2003): 2,036,000 viewers and 18.3% share
2003/04: 2,843,000 viewers and 24.3% share
2004/05: 2,976,000 viewers and 25.1% share
2005/06: 2,882,000 viewers and 24% share
2006/07: 3,090,000 viewers and 25.7% share
2007/08: 2,588,000 viewers and 21.5% share

References

External links
 Official Site 

2003 Spanish television series debuts
2008 Spanish television series endings
Spanish television talk shows
Telecinco original programming
2000s Spanish television series